Haripora, also known as Haripur, is a village in Ganderbal district of Jammu and Kashmir union territory of India. It is situated about 10 km from Beehama.

References

Villages in Ganderbal district